Wirral Grammar School for Boys was founded in 1931 as a maintained selective grammar school for boys aged 11–18. It is situated on a  site to the west of Port Sunlight at Cross Lane, Bebington, on the Wirral Peninsula in England. Academically successful, the school was placed 42nd in the top 100 in the Daily Telegraph A-Level table in 2015 and 145th in the DfE GCSE table in the same year, but has not been inspected since its conversion to academy status. The school's main claim to fame lies in being the alma mater of former Prime Minister of the United Kingdom Harold Wilson, who was a member of the sixth form from 1932 to 1934 and was the school's first Head Boy.

History 
On 23 March 1925, Cheshire County Council passed a resolution to build a new secondary school in Bebington. Designed by the County architect, F Anstead Browne, the new school was opened by the Lord Lieutenant of Cheshire, Brigadier-General Sir William Bromley-Davenport on 26 September 1931.

The school was administered by Cheshire County Council until the council was dissolved in 1974; since then it has been administered by Wirral Metropolitan Borough Council, which maintains use of the 11+ for senior school admission.

In 2008 the borough council resolved to replace mobile classrooms with a brick building for the mathematics department, business studies facilities, some history and geography rooms, an extra Modern Foreign Languages room, additional science laboratories, a new music centre and several ICT suites. There is now an exterior science area (including a greenhouse), and refurbishment of the main building included two sixth form history and politics classrooms. An entrance atrium, where exhibitions of pupils' work are held, is part of the new development.

The school was designated as a Business and Enterprise School in 2006 and became a Business and Enterprise College in 2008. This provided a grant for development of ICT facilities and for the business studies department to benefit both pupils and the wider community, including summer classes in ICT, photography and basic business skills. ICT suites and business studies classrooms were also developed in the new building. Although special funding for such colleges ended in 2010, the schools has chosen to retain its focus on business and enterprise.

In 2008 a school radio station was established, called Livewire Radio, broadcasting daily at lunchtimes. Students and teachers host the shows, featuring various musical genres and discussions regarding issues relevant to pupils.

Over the course of summer 2013, further development included a new multi-purpose activity hall, refurbished conference hall, new cookery classrooms and refurbished changing rooms. During the summer of 2012, an outdoor classroom was built as part of the art department on land previously occupied by music rooms. The landscaped area is used by the department for observational work and the displaying of 3-d pieces. It came into use in September 2012.

Curriculum 

At GCSE level, boys from 2023 will take 9 GCSEs. Core subjects are English, Mathematics, Science (combined or triple), a language (French or Spanish) and History or Geography. Optional subjects include Art & Design, IT, DT, Computer Science, Music, P.E and RS. Additional 'A'-Level choices are Law, Economics and Psychology. 

Previously Latin, Greek, Russian and German were options. At the beginning of the school's life, French was taught along with Latin. Pupils were later given a choice between French and German. Greek was provided for pupils who showed strength in languages.

Extracurricular activities

Sport 
The school has been commended for its sporting commitment, with particular efforts in Rugby union, with a tradition of the sport at the school. School rugby teams often tour, including to Australia and the United States. The most notable achiever in recent years is the rugby player Matt Cairns of Saracens & England. Other sports promoted in the school include athletics, badminton, basketball, cross country running, handball and volleyball.

Other outdoor activities (developed at the school's outdoor centres on Anglesey and near Mold) include abseiling, caving, climbing, raft building and various high level rope activities.

Drama and music 

The school's drama society has produced a number of plays and musicals jointly with the neighbouring Wirral Grammar School for Girls.  The music society provides tours for the concert band and the choir, having performed in the Black Forest, Canada, Italy, Spain, Austria and France, including performances in both the South of France and Paris. Prior to the music tours, the two ensembles occasionally perform at local venues in order to raise funds for the tours. The choir, concert band and orchestra, in addition to several smaller musical groups, perform three concerts a year held in the school hall, as well as a carol service in the nearby St Andrew's Church, Bebington, at Christmas.

Headmasters 
 1931–54 – James M. Moir
 1955–72 – Bernard H. T. Taylor
 1972–86 – Peter A. Fishwick
 1986–97 – Bernard J. Treacy
 1997–2006 – Anthony M. Cooper
 2006–2020 – David R. Hazeldine
 2020–present – Simon Ascroft
Interim headmasters have included O. Wilson (1954), B. Thompson (1986, 1997) and A. P. White (2020).

Notable former teachers 
 Sir William F. Houghton, Education Officer of ILEA from 1965–71 (taught 1934-1936)
 Michael Briers, coach for the Olympic Handball Squad, saw the introduction of the sport at Wirral Grammar

Notable former pupils 

 Ken Beamish, forward for Tranmere Rovers
 Peter Black, Liberal Democrat member of the Welsh Assembly for South Wales West since 1999
 Matt Cairns, former rugby union player for Sale Sharks, Saracens and England
 Alex Cox, film director
 John Ebbrell, former football player for Everton F.C. as a midfielder
 Kenneth Halliwell, writer and also mentor, lover and eventual murderer of playwright Joe Orton
 John Hardwick, television, film and theatre director
 Daniel Hunt, musician, songwriter, producer and founding member, principal songwriter and producer of the electronic band Ladytron.
 Oliver James (footballer)
 Steve Jones, professor of genetics since 1992 at the Galton Laboratory of University College London, and author who wrote The Language of the Genes
 Bernard Elgey Leake, professor of geology from 1974–97 at the University of Glasgow, and President from 1986–88 of the Geological Society of London
Kevin Lewis, footballer for Liverpool, Huddersfield and Sheffield United
 Justin Madders, Labour MP for Ellesmere Port and Neston
 Max Power, footballer for Sunderland A.F.C.
 Ted Robbins, comedian and actor
 Ted Rowlands, Baron Rowlands CBE, Labour MP for Cardiff North from 1966–70, for Merthyr Tydfil from 1972–83, and for Merthyr Tydfil and Rhymney from 1983–2001, and served as a Foreign Office junior minister in Harold Wilson's government
 Grant Serpell, musician
 Sir Brian Smith, Vice-Chancellor from 1993–2001 of Cardiff University
 Paul Usher, actor who played Barry Grant in Brookside
 Air Commodore Bob Weighill CBE DFC, station commander of RAF Cottesmore (1961–64) and RAF Halton (1968–73); Rugby Football Union international player and captain; secretary of the RFU from 1974 to 1986
 Michael Wilde, former Chairman of Southampton F.C.
 Barry Williams (athlete), Olympic hammer thrower in the 1972 Olympics
 Harold Wilson, Labour Prime Minister 1964–70 and 1974-6 (only attended the sixth form in 1932 to 1934, having previously been a pupil at Royds Hall School in Huddersfield)
 John Winn, British Army officer and winner of the Military Cross and Silver Star.

See also 
 Wirral Grammar School for Girls
 Calday Grange Grammar School
 West Kirby Grammar School
 Bebington High School

References

Bibliography 
 The History of Wirral Grammar School for Boys 1931–1991, Murphy, Pete (1991)

External links 

Google Map of the school
LiveWire Radio – official school Radio Station
EduBase

1931 establishments in England
Boys' schools in Merseyside
Educational institutions established in 1931
Grammar schools in the Metropolitan Borough of Wirral
International Baccalaureate schools in England
Academies in the Metropolitan Borough of Wirral